KwikChex is an online investigation and reputation management firm founded by Chris Emmins. It was founded in Bournemouth, United Kingdom in 2010, and moved to Taunton in 2018.
It is particularly known for its work in consumer protection, including creating and managing the Timeshare Task Force and for challenging the authenticity of content on online review websites.

Investigations
Emmins believes that TripAdvisor unfairly and inconsistently penalises small businesses when a person connected to the business posts reviews, while larger businesses are not penalised in the same way. He has particularly questioned the integrity of TripAdvisor's Chinese operation: Emmins identified “amazingly prolific” reviewers on the TripAdvisor's Chinese site, including one who had posted 2,633 reviews between 2010 and 2014.  In 2010 the company was canvassing a group defamation action against TripAdvisor for carrying hostile reviews  invented or exaggerated, or posted by business rivals.

In September 2011 KwikChex and two hotels filed a complaint with the  UK Advertising Standards Authority (United Kingdom) challenging online reviews site TripAdvisor’s claims to provide trustworthy and honest reviews from real travellers. The Advertising Standards Authority found that TripAdvisor "should not claim or imply that all its reviews were from real travellers, or were honest, real or trusted", and as a result of the investigation, the complaint was upheld and TripAdvisor was ordered to remove the slogan "reviews you can trust" from its UK website. It changed its hotel review section slogan to "reviews from our community".

In 2013, a KwikChex investigation exposed Accor Hotels executive Peter Hook as the person behind anonymous, glowing reviews of Accor’s own hotels and of negative reviews on competitor hotels. His reviews, included one for Accor’s Sofitel Phnom Penh Phokeethra which read “I didn't know much about the hotel scene so booked a brand I knew well. It turned out to be a good choice”.

In 2015, Emmins appeared on a BBC News investigations programme after a KwikChex investigation revealed that most of the reviews on online reviews site Trustpilot for a business named Bizzyloans, were fake and that one involved identity theft, using the name and picture of a woman who had died.

In October 2018, Emmins appeared on a BBC News investigation programme concerning  the food hygiene standards of businesses providing food through online delivery business Just Eat. The programme showed that many food providers on the Just Eat platform were officially rated as having failed official heath inspections. Emmins called for Just Eat to display the official Food Standards Agency  hygiene rating for each food provider on their individual entry. In June 2019, following extensive further critical media coverage, Just Eat commenced displaying the official ratings of a provider on their website.

In September 2019, Wired magazine published details of a KwikChex investigation into reviews of estate agent Purplebricks published on online reviews website Trustpilot. The article detailed how KwikChex had found the ways that Purplebricks was manipulating reviews and rating results on the Trustpilot site.

On the 10th of February 2022, KwikChex was featured in an article in the UK  Mirror newspaper following a joint investigation on cryptocurrency reviews on the Trustpilot site.

Awards 
In June 2019, KwikChex received a ‘Hero Award’ from the Chartered Trading Standards Institute (CTSI) "for its continuous work and passionate commitment on behalf of consumers, particularly around timeshare scams".
Chief Executive at CTSI, Leon Livermore, said: “The Business Award is designed to recognise businesses that demonstrate a dedication to protecting consumers. KwikChex not only strives to help consumers who have suffered at the hands of ruthless fraudsters but have been a strong supporter of our profession. I’m pleased to name them our 2019 Business Hero”.

References

External links

Companies based in Taunton
Reputation management companies